The Yale Daily News is an independent student newspaper published by Yale University students in New Haven, Connecticut since January 28, 1878. It is the oldest college daily newspaper in the United States. The Yale Daily News has consistently been ranked among the top college daily newspapers in the country.

Description 
Financially and editorially independent of Yale University since its founding, the Yale Daily News is published online by a student editorial and business staff five days a week, Monday through Friday, during Yale's academic year. Although the paper historically produced a daily print edition, it transitioned during the COVID-19 pandemic in 2020 to a weekly print schedule and now prints only a Friday paper. Called the YDN (or sometimes the News, the Daily News, or the Daily Yalie), the paper and the website are produced in the Briton Hadden Memorial Building at 202 York Street in New Haven and printed off-site at Valley Publishing Company in Derby, Connecticut.

Each day, reporters, mainly freshmen and sophomores, cover the university, the city of New Haven and sometimes the state of Connecticut.  Besides updating its website with new stories five days a week, the YDN sends out daily, weekend and breaking -news newsletters and posts its contents to Instagram, Facebook, Twitter, TikTok and YouTube. Its robust multimedia platforms include YTV, which produces video news, features and commentary, and numerous podcast series.

The YDN also publishes a daily opinion section, a Friday "Weekend" section and special issues focusing on the experiences of Latinx, Black and Asian students in October, February and April, respectively.

Staff members generally serve as editors on the managing board during their junior year.  A single chairman led the editorial and business sides of the News until 1970. Today, the editor-in-chief also serves as president of the Yale Daily News Publishing Company, while the publisher oversees business operations. An editorial board, independent of the newsroom, publishes a monthly column

In addition to the newspaper, the Yale Daily News Publishing Company produces the Yale Daily News Magazine and special newspaper issues for the incoming freshman class, Yale's Class Day and Commencement and The Game against Harvard University.

History 
In its inaugural edition on January 28, 1878, the newspaper's first editors wrote: "The innovation which we begin by this morning's issue is justified by the dullness of the times, and the demand for news among us."

In 1920, the News began to report on national news and viewpoints. In 1940 and 1955, when professional dailies were not operating due to unrest among its workers, the News continued to report on national topics.

From 1968 to 1970, the YDN published a cartoon strip called Bull Tales by Garry Trudeau '70, parodying the exploits of Yale quarterback Brian Dowling. The strip which was reborn as Doonesbury and syndicated in newspapers nationwide for decades.

When women first arrive at Yale College in the fall of 1969, the YDN was one of Yale's first meaningfully coed student organizations. Within weeks, the newspaper published bylined articles by five women—Dori Zaleznik, Shelley Fisher (now Fishkin), Martha Wesson, Linda Temoshok (now Lydia Temoshok] and Ruth Falk. That first year, Fisher and Zaleznik were elected to the 1971 Editorial Board and Falk and Temoshok to the 1972 Editorial Board.

The YDN was also among the first student organizations to elect women to leadership roles. Zaleznik was elected Associate Executive Editor in 1970. Amy Oshinsky became the first female publisher in 1975. Anne ("Andy") Perkins was elected the first female editor-in-chief in 1979.

The News survived for a century solely on income generated by subscriptions and ad sales. But by the mid 1970s, its Gothic building on the Yale campus had fallen into disrepair and help was needed to maintain it. In 1978, a group of News alumni including Eric Nestler '76, Jonathan Rose '63, Jim Ottaway '60 and Joseph Leiberman '64 created the Oldest College Daily Foundation to solicit philanthropic support for building repairs and capital expenditures.

The Foundation changed its name to the Yale Daily News Foundation in 2018 and now provides financial support to News staffers who would otherwise need to take paying jobs during the academic year and staffers taking low-paying journalism jobs during the summer. The YDN student staff continues to be responsible for all editorial and business decisions.

The YDN has won numerous awards for its design and editorial content. Its front page design for November 5, 2008, the day after Barack Obama's victory in the 2008 Presidential Election, was featured in the Poynter Institute book: President Obama Election 2008: Collection of Newspaper Front Pages by the Poynter Institute.

In 2009, the Yale Daily News won the Associated Collegiate Press Newspaper Pacemaker Award. On September 10 of that year the News broke the news of the murder of Annie Le, a Yale graduate student reported missing and subsequently found murdered in the basement of her laboratory.  On November 21, 2019, the News published an article detailing allegations of impropriety and sexual misconduct against Brendan Faherty, the Yale women's soccer coach, by former players when he was coach of the women's soccer team at the University of New Haven from 2002 to 2009. Yale announced Faherty's departure the same day.

In summer 2010, the 78-year-old Briton Hadden Memorial Building was renovated, increasing the amount of usable space in the basement and adding a multimedia studio in the heart of the newsroom.

The Sterling Memorial Library at Yale University has an extensive Yale Daily News Historical Archive, containing digitized versions of printed issues from 1878 through 1995.  Digitization of issues from 1996 through the present is currently underway. The collection is indexed, searchable and available to the public.

Contested claim 
The News, founded in 1878, calls itself the "oldest college daily" in the United States, a claim contested by other student newspapers.

The Harvard Crimson calls itself "the oldest continuously published college daily", but it was founded in 1873 as a fortnightly publication called The Magenta and did not appear daily until 1883. (The News ceased publishing briefly during World War I and World War II after editors volunteered for military service.) The Daily Targum at Rutgers University was founded in 1869 but was published initially as a monthly newspaper and did not gain independence from the University until 1980. The Columbia Daily Spectator, founded one year earlier than the YDN in 1877, calls itself the second-oldest college daily, but was not independent until the 1960s. Similarly, the Daily Californian at the University of California, Berkeley, was founded in 1871 but did not achieve independence until 1971. The Cornell Daily Sun, launched in 1880, calls itself the "oldest independent college newspaper", notwithstanding the YDN'''s independence since its founding two years earlier. The Dartmouth of Dartmouth College, which opened in 1799 as the Dartmouth Gazette, calls itself the oldest college newspaper, though not the oldest daily. Most accurately put, the News is the oldest independent college daily newspaper.

 Alumni 
The News serves as a training ground for journalists at Yale, and has produced a steady stream of professional reporters who work at newspapers, magazines and websites including The Washington Post, The Wall Street Journal, The New York Times, The Los Angeles Times, Time, Newsweek, The New Yorker,  The Economist , ProPublica and Politico.Yale Daily News alumni have also pioneered new forms of American journalism. Shortly after graduating from Yale, classmates and rivals Briton Hadden '20 and Henry Luce '20 co-founded Time Inc. and its magazine empire. In 2010, Paul Steiger '64, the longtime managing editor of The Wall Street Journal, co-founded ProPublic Inc., a nonprofit online newsroom that has won six Pulitzer Prizes for investigative journalism.

 Politics 
 Potter Stewart, former Supreme Court associate justice
 Brett Kavanaugh, Supreme Court associate Justice
 Joseph Lieberman, former US Senator from Connecticut, 2000 Vice Presidential nominee and 2004 presidential candidate
 Steve Mnuchin, Secretary of Treasury under former President Donald Trump 
 Samantha Power, former United States Ambassador to the United Nations, USAID Director
 Strobe Talbott, president of the Brookings Institution and former Deputy Secretary of State under President Clinton
 Jake Sullivan, national security advisor to President Joseph Biden
 William L. Borden, executive director of United States Congress Joint Committee on Atomic Energy, 1949–53
 Lanny Davis, advisor to President Clinton, author and public relations expert
 David Gergen, advisor to four presidents and U.S. News & World Report editor-at-large
 Reed Hundt, former FCC chairman
 Robert D. Orr, former governor of Indiana
 David A. Pepper, Ohio politician
 Andrew Romanoff, former Colorado Speaker of the House, candidate for Democratic nomination to US Senate
 Sargent Shriver, first Peace Corps director
 Stuart Symington, former US senator from Missouri
 Garry Trudeau, cartoonist and creator of Doonesbury, which first appeared in the News' pages as Bull Tales Journalism 
 Pete Axthelm, sportswriter
 Michael Barbaro, host of The Daily by The New York Times Ellen Barry, Pulitzer Prize–winning Moscow correspondent, The New York Times Alex Berenson, novelist and former business reporter for The New York Times Christopher Buckley, novelist and writer
 William F. Buckley Jr., founder of National Review Meghan Clyne is a Washington, D.C.-based writer, recently for The Weekly Standard Henry S.F. Cooper, a New Yorker journalist and author
 Michael Crowley, senior editor, New Republic Charles Duhigg, business reporter for The New York Times Charles Forelle, European correspondent for The Wall Street Journal Dan Froomkin, Washington Editor of TheIntercept.com
 Zack O'Malley Greenburg, Forbes staff writer and author of Jay-Z biography Empire State of Mind Lloyd Grove, freelance writer, former gossip columnist for the New York Daily News and The Washington Post Briton Hadden, co-founder of Time R. Thomas Herman, reporter and tax columnist for The Wall Street Journal John Hersey, Pulitzer Prize–winning journalist and author
 Robert G. Kaiser, associate editor of The Washington Post Matthew Kaminski, editorial board member, The Wall Street Journal David Leonhardt, Pulitzer Prize–winning economics columnist, The New York Times Joanne Lipman, founding Editor-in-Chief of Conde Nast Portfolio magazine and former Deputy Managing Editor of The Wall Street Journal.
 Adam Liptak, supreme court correspondent for The New York Times Henry Luce, co-founder of Time Dana Milbank, columnist and former White House correspondent for The Washington Post Martine Powers, senior audio producer and host of Post Reports by The Washington Post Philip Rucker, White House bureau chief for The Washington Post
 Robert Semple, Pulitzer Prize winner and former member of The New York Times editorial board
 Paul Steiger, Emeritus Editor-in-Chief of "ProPublica," former managing editor of The Wall Street Journal John Tierney, columnist for The New York Times Calvin Trillin, columnist and humorist
 Jacob Weisberg, editor of Slate Vivian Yee, Cairo bureau chief for The New York Times Other 
 Kingman Brewster, former president of Yale University and ambassador to the Court of St. James's
 Lan Samantha Chang, director of Iowa Writers' Workshop
 Theo Epstein, Chicago Cubs general manager
 Thayer Hobson, chairman of William Morrow and Company
 Eli Jacobs, Wall Street investor.
 Ted Landsmark, educator and attorney
 Paul Mellon, philanthropist
 John E. Pepper Jr., former chairman of the Walt Disney Company
 Gaddis Smith, professor emeritus of history at Yale
 Lyman Spitzer, theoretical physicist
 Daniel Yergin, Pulitzer Prize-winning author and economic researcher

 In popular culture 
 The characters Rory Gilmore and Paris Geller have both served as editors of the Yale Daily News on the CW TV show Gilmore Girls.
 In The Great Gatsby'', narrator and protagonist Nick Carraway says that he wrote a series of editorials for the paper while in college.

References

External links 
 Official website
 Yale TV Main Page website
 125th Anniversary Exhibit
 Historical archive at Yale University

Publications established in 1878
Student newspapers published in Connecticut
Yale University publications
Mass media in New Haven County, Connecticut